Kathy Sambell (born 16 January 1963) is an Australian sprinter. She competed in the women's 4 × 100 metres relay at the 1992 Summer Olympics.

References

External links
 

1963 births
Living people
Athletes (track and field) at the 1992 Summer Olympics
Australian female sprinters
Olympic athletes of Australia
Place of birth missing (living people)
Commonwealth Games medallists in athletics
Commonwealth Games gold medallists for Australia
Commonwealth Games silver medallists for Australia
Athletes (track and field) at the 1990 Commonwealth Games
Athletes (track and field) at the 1994 Commonwealth Games
Olympic female sprinters
21st-century Australian women
20th-century Australian women
Medallists at the 1990 Commonwealth Games
Medallists at the 1994 Commonwealth Games